Indika Bandaranayake (born September 7, 1972) is a Sri Lankan politician, a member of the Parliament of Sri Lanka and he is the former Deputy Minister of Housing and Construction. It is widely believe that Bandaranyake is to be a top level powerful Minister in Sri Lanka.

References
 

1972 births
Living people
Members of the 12th Parliament of Sri Lanka
Members of the 13th Parliament of Sri Lanka
Members of the 14th Parliament of Sri Lanka
Members of the 15th Parliament of Sri Lanka
Government ministers of Sri Lanka
United National Party politicians
United People's Freedom Alliance politicians